The Noise Revival Orchestra is an orchestral indie collective based in Austin, Texas. Formed in 2004 as a 4 piece by Nathan Felix, The Noise Revival Orchestra has grown to a 13 to 17 piece orchestra.

In 2008, the band was featured on mtvU Ahead of the Curve. In 2009, The Noise Revival's "Days n Daze" was used in the PSA video  for Institute for Democratic Education in America.

In May 2010, Nathan Felix traveled to Denmark with The House of Songs to participate in a three-day intensive songwriting collaboration and to perform at SPOT and Inter SPOT as part of The Austin Five. The Noise Revival Orchestra released Songs of Forgiveness in the spring of 2011 and subsequently toured Denmark, Iceland, & the Faroe Islands to support it.

In 2014, The Noise Revival Orchestra, did a tour in Taiwan and Japan highlighted by festival dates where TNRO performed for crowds of 35,000 and 50,000 at the Taichung Jazz Festival.

Felix is currently writing the film score for an upcoming Andrew Shapter film entitled "The Teller and The Truth". The film is set to be released in 2015 as well as premiering is 2nd symphony, Neon Heaven, at SPOT Festival in 2015. .

Releases
To the Seven Churches in the Province of Asia (2004)
Live Tour EP (2005)
TNROEP (2007)
Farilya EP (2009)
BMBT (2010)
Songs of Forgiveness (2011)

References

External links 
 

American art rock groups
Indie rock musical groups from Texas
Musical groups from Austin, Texas
Musical groups established in 2004
2004 establishments in Texas